"Big Box Little Box" is a song by Irish comedy duo Damo and Ivor, released on 26 November 2011. This song is the second released by the duo, from their album Epic Choons.

Music video
A music video for the song was released on 23 October 2011, which has gained over 1.7 million views.

References

Irish songs
2011 songs